Altsak is a rural locality (a selo) and the administrative centre of Altsakskoye Rural Settlement, Dzhidinsky District, Republic of Buryatia, Russia. The population was 363 as of 2017. There are 4 streets.

Geography 
Altsak is located 73 km northwest of Petropavlovka (the district's administrative centre) by road. Armak is the nearest rural locality.

References 

Rural localities in Dzhidinsky District